Hahasrin bin Hashim is a Malaysian politician from UMNO. He is the Member of Johor State Legislative Assembly for Panti since 2018.

Education 
He is a Bachelor of Electronics Engineering from University of York.

Politics 
He was the Youth Chief of UMNO Johor and UMNO Tenggara branch. He is currently the Deputy Chief of UMNO Tenggara branch.

Election result

Personal life 
He was married to Janatul Islah Mohammad and has 4 children. His wife passed away on 18 December 2018 in Subang Jaya Medical Centre.

Reference 

1976 births
Living people
United Malays National Organisation politicians
Members of the Johor State Legislative Assembly
Alumni of the University of York
21st-century Malaysian politicians